Apyrase (ATP-diphosphatase, adenosine diphosphatase, ADPase, ATP diphosphohydrolase) is a calcium-activated plasma membrane-bound enzyme (magnesium can also activate it) that catalyses the hydrolysis of ATP to yield AMP and inorganic phosphate. Two isoenzymes are found in commercial preparations from S. tuberosum. One with a higher ratio of substrate selectivity for ATP:ADP (approx 10) and another with no selectivity (ratio 1).

It can also act on ADP and other nucleoside triphosphates and diphosphates with the general reaction being NTP -> NDP + Pi -> NMP + 2Pi. This is the same activity that has been employed in the degradation of unincorporated nucleosides during pyrosequencing.

The salivary apyrases of blood-feeding arthropods are nucleotide hydrolysing enzymes that are implicated in the inhibition of host platelet aggregation through the hydrolysis of extracellular adenosine diphosphate.

References

External links
 

Protein families
EC 3.6.1